Burçak Tarlası (literally "Vetch Field") is the arranged form of a Turkish folkloric tune (türkü) and it is one of the pioneers in Turkish pop music. There are similar folkloric dance tunes known as "Ka mi ispadnala moma Katerina" in North Macedonia, and "Στην Αγιά Μαρκέλλα" in Greece. However, "Burçak Tarlası" is based on a tragic real-life story.

Original form
The original form of the türkü was popular in Central Anatolia . It was probably composed by a folk poet known as Kör Şakir (Şakir the Blind) in 1931. According to unconfirmed stories, the lyrics refer to Meryem Sayar a newly wed woman who complains from her mother in law. Her mother in law who was the wife of a late muhtar of Zengen village ( Konya Province) wakes her up very early in the mornings and forces her to work hard  in the vetch fields. In one couplet she complaints:

Aman da kızlar ne zor imiş burçak yolması 
Burçak tarlasında yar yar gelin olması.

 Oh Girls how hard it is to tear up vetch,
(And) to be a bride in a vetch field.

Arranged form
In 1964, this song was arranged to be played in modern instruments.  Tülay German, hitherto a jass singer accompanied by the Donuk Onatkut orchestra played the melody. The result was a big success. Burçak Tarlası was not only a hit. According to one view by this melody,  the first seeds of Anatolian rock had been disseminated.

Record
Tülay German released "Burçak Tarlası" as a 45 rpm (on Ezgi Records). The reverse side of the record she sang another arranged türkü: "Mecnunum Leylamı Gördüm".

See also
Ballos
Syrtos
Cerkez kizi
Bir tas attim kamisa

References

Turkish folk songs
1964 singles
1931 songs